Catherine Arlove (born 5 February 1971 in Malvern, Victoria) is an Australian judoka who has also represented Australia in wrestling and competed at a national level in cycling. Arlove has won ten Gold medals at the Australian National Judo Championships.

She competed in judo at the 2000, 2004 and 2008 Olympics with her best result being a fourth placing in the 63 kg class at the Athens Games. She also competed in the third season of Gladiators, coming runner-up to Marissa Huettner.

References

Australian Olympic Committee profile

1971 births
Living people
Australian female judoka
Judoka at the 2000 Summer Olympics
Judoka at the 2004 Summer Olympics
Judoka at the 2008 Summer Olympics
Olympic judoka of Australia
20th-century Australian women
21st-century Australian women
People from Malvern, Victoria
Sportspeople from Melbourne